Season 1885–86 was the eleventh season in which Heart of Midlothian competed at a Scottish national level, entering the Scottish Cup for the eleventh time.

Overview 
Hearts reached the second round of the Scottish Cup and were knocked out by Edinburgh rivals Hibs. They had to play their first round tie twice due to a protest by St Bernard's they won both games.

Results

Scottish Cup

FA Cup

Edinburgh Shield

Rosebery Charity Cup

See also
List of Heart of Midlothian F.C. seasons

References 

 Statistical Record 85-86

External links 
 Official Club website

Heart of Midlothian F.C. seasons
Hearts